FreeUp! The Emancipation Day Special is an annual Canadian television special, which was broadcast for the first time by CBC Gem on August 1, 2020. Growing out of an arts festival created by actress Ngozi Paul in 2017, the special features musical, acting, dancing, comedy and spoken word performances by Black Canadian and Indigenous Canadian performing artists to celebrate Emancipation Day.

The first special, aired in 2020, featured Jully Black, Jay Rukas, Sarah Musa, Chivengi, David Delisca, Andrew Forde, Zoë Edwards, Amina AbNa Alfred, Mackenta, Amaka Umeh, Janette King, Aba Amuquandoh, Hassanlogic, Snoopy, Jendayi Dyer, Travis Knights, Jaz Fairy J and Esie Mensah. The second special, aired in 2021, featured Aquakultre, Bukola, Peace Akintade, Tawiah M'carthy, Silla + Rise, Luke Reece, Shah Frank, Randell Adjei, Wayne Tennant, Michie Mee, Haviah Mighty, Hollywood Jade, Anyika Mark, Aria Evans, RVZON and d’bi.young anitafrika.

The 2020 special received a Canadian Screen Award nomination for Best Performing Arts Program at the 9th Canadian Screen Awards in 2021.

References

Canadian television specials
2020 Canadian television series debuts
2020s Black Canadian television series
CBC Gem original programming